Return to Return to Nuke 'Em High AKA Volume 2 is a 2017 American science fiction comedy horror film, made by the cult classic B-movie production group Troma Entertainment. It is directed by Troma co-founder Lloyd Kaufman and the fifth in the Nuke 'Em High film series.

Plot
Lauren (Catherine Corcoran) and her blogger girlfriend Chrissy (Asta Paredes) must save Tromaville's Nuke 'Em High from the ongoing effects of the nuclear-sludge filled tacos from Tromorganic Foodstuffs, while also trying to keep their illicit love affair from being unmasked.

Cast
Asta Paredes as Chrissy
Catherine Corcoran as Lauren
Vito Trigo as Leonardo
Clay von Carlowitz as Eugene
Zac Amico as Zac
Lemmy as The President
Lloyd Kaufman as Lee Harvey Herzkauf
Ron Jeremy as God
Monique Dupree as Shower Girl
Nadia White as Lacey

Production
A majority of the fifth film was shot concurrently with the fourth film, Return to Nuke 'Em High Volume 1. Principal photography began in August 2012 and finished in September 2012. However, the film suffered an extended post-production period. In June 2015, Troma launched a crowdfunding campaign and raised $63,615 for post-production costs.

Release
The sequel premiered at the Cannes Film Festival in May 2017 with some slight controversy as Kaufman stated Troma employees were "slapped around and arrested by thugs in suits joined by police" while promoting the film. The film had its American debut with a Los Angeles premiere on March 8, 2018 at the Ahrya Fine Arts Theater in Beverly Hills, California.

Prior to its home video debut, Troma allowed fans a three-day digital rental of the movie online for $4.99 in February 2019. The movie released on Blu-ray on November 12, 2019.

Reception
Reviews were generally positive with nearly all noting the film's various excesses. Writing of the 2017 Cannes premiere, Simon Abrams of RogerEbert.com said "Kaufman delivers everything exploitation fans want: full frontal nudity, duck rape, mutant monsters, oodles of blood and gore, a fat man with a Prince Albert genital piercing, and more" and that this film "might be Kaufman's angriest polemic yet, and it's consequently his looniest." Katie Walsh of The Los Angeles Times stated one had to admire "Kaufman for staying so committed to sensational, offensive exploitation filmmaking." Film Threat gave the film 4 out of 5 stars and called it "Troma’s most manic magnum opus yet" that could be considered "the all too meta, fourth wall breaking, asylum wall destroying amalgamation of everything Kaufman has been working towards in his career." Glenn Kenny of The New York Times called the film a "putrid but at times oddly amiable exercise" that "offers a relentless barrage of toilet humor, haphazard film parodies and gore effects that are no less repellent for being unconvincing."

References

External links
 
 
 Official website
 The official home of Troma Entertainment

American comedy horror films
American science fiction comedy films
American science fiction horror films
2010s English-language films
Films directed by Lloyd Kaufman
Films set in New Jersey
Films shot in New Jersey
Films shot in New York (state)
American independent films
Punk films
Troma Entertainment films
2010s science fiction films
2010s American films